Vinícius Silvestre da Costa (born 28 March 1994), known as Vinícius Silvestre or just Vinícius, is a Brazilian footballer who plays as a goalkeeper for Palmeiras.

Career statistics

Honours
Palmeiras
Campeonato Brasileiro Série B: 2013
Campeonato Brasileiro Série A: 2016, 2022
Campeonato Paulista: 2020, 2022
Copa do Brasil: 2015, 2020
Copa Libertadores: 2020, 2021
Recopa Sudamericana: 2022
Ponte Preta
 Campeonato Paulista do Interior: 2018

References

External links

1994 births
Living people
Brazilian footballers
Brazil youth international footballers
Association football goalkeepers
Campeonato Brasileiro Série A players
Campeonato Brasileiro Série B players
Sociedade Esportiva Palmeiras players
Associação Atlética Ponte Preta players
Clube de Regatas Brasil players
People from Guarulhos
Footballers from São Paulo (state)